The Sea of Naples is a 1919 silent Italian drama film directed by Carmine Gallone.

Cast
 Alberto Capozzi as Sergio Stierni
 Mina D'Orvella as Sophia Gorka
 Silvana (actor)|Silvana as Chiara Stella
 Ida Carloni Talli
 Achille Vitti as D. Antonio
 Alfredo Bertone

References

External links
 

1919 films
1919 drama films
Italian silent feature films
Italian black-and-white films
Films directed by Carmine Gallone
Italian drama films
Silent drama films